Te with caron is a letter of the Cyrillic script. It is used in the Shughni and Wakhi languages for the  sound, like the th in 'thing'. It was also formerly used in the Chuvash language.